The Minoan chronology dating system is a measure of the phases of the Minoan civilization. Initially established as a relative dating system by English archaeologist Sir Arthur Evans between 1900 and 1903 based on his analysis of Minoan pottery during his excavations at Knossos on Crete, new technologies including carbon dating and DNA analysis have led to significant revisions to the date ranges.

The Minoan Bronze Age period is divided into "Early Minoan" ("EM"), "Middle Minoan" ("MM"), and "Late Minoan" ("LM"), each sub-divided by Roman numerals I to III, and in many cases by a further "A" or "B," so, for example, "MM IIIB."

In 1958 Nikolaos Platon proposed a new chronology at the Prehistoric Conference in Hamburg, based on the development of the architectural complexes known as "palaces" at Knossos, Phaistos, Malia, and Kato Zakros. In it, the terms "Pre-palace," "Old Palace," and "New Palace" were to replace Evans' scheme. The academic community accepted the scheme but not as a replacement, simply stating where in Evans' system the new terms fit. They are now usually called Prepalatial, Protopalatial, Neopalatial, and Postpalatial in English.

Evans and Knossos
Arthur Evans began excavating on a hill called tou tseleve he kephala, "the headland of the chieftain", some three miles (5 km) from the north coast of Crete, on March 23, 1900. Two of the palace storerooms had been uncovered by Minos Kalokairinos in 1878, whose work ceased at the demand of the land owners. Simultaneously, coins and seals inscribed with a mysterious script were also discovered. These came to Evans' attention as the curator of the Ashmolean Museum at Oxford, a position he held from 1884 to 1908. The area was rumored to have been the site of the ancient city of Knossos.

Evans examined the site on March 19, 1894. In 1899 Evans purchased the land with his own funds and decided to set up an excavation. In the first two weeks he discovered Linear A tablets.

Attacking the site with crews of hundreds of diggers, Evans uncovered most of the site's  within 6 seasons. By 1905 he had named the civilization whose traces he found there Minoan, after the legendary king Minos, and had created a detailed chronology of the serial phases of the pottery styles in Minoan Crete, based on what he found at Knossos. Subsequently, he concerned himself mainly with restoration. He continued to excavate there and elsewhere and to restore until 1935.

In 1921, the first edition of Evans' work on Crete, Palace of Minos, was released.

On Evans' death in 1941, the British School of Archaeology assumed responsibility for the excavation, later turning the property over to the Greek government, while retaining excavation rights.

Evans' chronology
Evans' chronological framework had triple divisions each triply divided, a formula that has been retained, thus Early Minoan (EM) I, II and III, Middle Minoan (MM) I, II and III etc. Each subsection he divided into A and B, early and late. In 1918 Alan J. B. Wace and Carl Blegen adapted Evans' chronology to the Greek mainland and the islands, where the culture was termed Helladic and Cycladic. In 1941 Arne Furumark applied the term Mycenaean to LH and LC. As the Mycenaean Greeks dominated at Knossos at some point in Late Minoan (LM), the latter is often included under "Mycenaean" or called "Minoan-Mycenaean".

Evans never intended to give exact calendrical dates to the pottery periods. He did correlate them roughly to better dated Egyptian periods using finds of Egyptian artifacts in association with Cretan ones and obvious similarities of some types of Cretan artifacts with Egyptian ones.

The one serious question concerns the date of the Knossos tablets. Allegations were made that Evans falsified the stratum in which the tablets were found to place the tablets at 1400 BCE when they ought to have been the same date as the Pylos tablets, 1200 BCE. This dispute became known as the Palmer-Boardman Dispute when it first appeared. A key part of the case was that a certain kind of vase, a stirrup jar (named from the handles) found in tablet contexts, is dated only to 1200.

Modern chronology 
Beginning in the 1940s with the advent of technologies such as radiocarbon dating, and the expansion of historical knowledge of the Mediterranean region, Minoan chronologies have shifted away from Evans' purely relative system and incorporated more absolute dates.

Modern chronologies are generally divided into three primary categories that retain the general framework developed by Evans: "high chronology," methods using technological solutions such as radiocarbon dating to determine the time period of an artifact's creation, "low chronology," composed of more traditional methods relying on Minoan artifacts found in contexts that allow them to be dated, such as next to an item produced by a different civilization or in a location outside of Crete, for example Cretan pottery found in the tomb of the Egyptian Pharaoh Thutmose III. The third modern chronological style is a combination of the two methods.

Theran eruption 

The timing of natural disasters is of importance to high and low chronologies, which can use the resulting geological evidence to date co-located artifacts. The eruption of the Thera volcano on what is now the island of Santorini is of particular significance to the chronology of Minoan history.

The Theran eruption plays a role in both the high and low chronological approaches, although there is a difference in the date range each system assigns to the event. In his initial framework, Evans vaguely assigned the eruption to the 17th century BCE. Low chronological assessments revise the eruption to the mid-15th century, while high and blended chronologies push the date back to a point in between Evans' and low chronologies, a more commonly accepted specific date of approximately 1628, though the date is by no means generally agreed.  The precise date is of more concern to archaeologists of the Asian mainland and Ancient Egypt, where volcanic ash from Thera is widely evident, and there are established competing chronologies, than to those of Crete.

High chronological techniques such as radiocarbon dating can be used in conjunction with evidence from artifacts indirectly related to the eruption, such as eruption-caused tsunami debris to pinpoint the exact timing of the event, and therefore which Minoan period it belongs in. However, the broadness of radiocarbon dating has also resulted in dates for the eruption of Thera that do not precisely match evidence from the archeological record.

Palaces of Crete and the palatial periods 

The island of Crete is home to several palaces constructed by the Minoan civilization, all of which are archeologically significant. The primary palaces were located at Knossos, Malia, and Phaistos. Each palace was constructed and rebuilt multiple times on the same sites. The palaces' distinct construction phases are used to further divide the relative periods of the Minoan chronology system into five distinct sections: prepalatial, protopalatial, neopalatial, late palatial or the final palace period, and the post-palatial period.

Prepalatial period 
The prepalatial period is a broad time period, spanning from approximately 7000 to 1900, and is itself divided into neolithic, early prepalatial, and late prepalatial sections. Characterized by the creation of large settlements at the locations where palaces would later be constructed and usage of early forms of the architecture later found at palatial sites, the prepalatial period contains the relative chronological divisions EM I through at least part of MM IA.

Protopalatial period 
The protopalatial period lasted from approximately 1900 until 1750, or in the relative chronology MM IB through MM IIB. The major palaces' completion occurred during this time-frame, distinguished by distinct ashlar masonry with marks created by the responsible masons. The protopalatial phase also saw the emergence of both the Linear A and Cretan hieroglyphic writing systems, although they likely initially saw use as early as the end of the previous period.

Neopalatial period 
The neopalatial period occurred during the relative chronological divisions of MM III and LM IB, a roughly 260-year span between 1750 and 1490 The period is represented by the dramatic expansion and reconstruction of the palace at Knossos, associated with Evans' discoveries of paintings featuring bulls, which he interpreted as evidence for the existence of the Labyrinth of Greek myth. Additional palaces were built at Galatas and Zakros, while the palaces at Malia and Phaistos underwent periods of destruction, abandonment, and reconstruction.

The Theran eruption occurred during the end of the neopalatial period, during the end of LM IA.

Late palatial period 

Beginning in the LM II period, approximately 1490, and ending with the start of the LM IIIB period 130 years later in 1360, the late palatial period was the final use of intact palace structures on Crete. The palaces at Phaistos, Galatas, Zakros, and Malia were largely destroyed and/or abandoned, while the palace at Knossos received its final additions.

The late palatial period marked the emergence of the Linear B script, an early form of written Greek, used at Knossos to record economic and administrative information.

Post-palatial period 
The post-palatial period of Minoan chronology, a roughly 140-year period between 1360 and 1200, falls into the last relative period defined by absolute dates, LM IIIB. The period saw Knossos lose prominence as a settlement, with the majority of new construction taking place at the agricultural and trade center of Mesara. The end of the post-palatial period also represented an emphasis of Mycenaean Greek styles of construction and architecture over traditional Minoan methods.

Other tables on the Internet
The search for a consistent chronology of Cretan civilization goes on. Other tabular chronologies have been published on the Internet by:
Ian Swindale, using the chronology of Andonis Vasilakis in his book on Minoan Crete, published by Adam Editions in 2000
Dartmouth College
ExploreCrete.com
World History Encyclopedia
Thera Foundation
L. Marangou in the Foundation of the Hellenic World site
Companion to Manning (Cornell)
University of Oklahoma

Notes

References

Hemingway, Seán,  Art of the Aegean Bronze Age, The Metropolitan Museum of Art Bulletin, Spring 2012 Volume LXIX, Number 4 (chronology table on p. 48)
 Hutchinson, Prehistoric Crete, many editions hardcover and softcover
 Matz, Friedrich, The Art of Crete and Early Greece, Crown, 1962
 Mackenzie, Donald A., Crete & Pre-Hellenic, Senate, 1995, 
 Palmer, L. A., Mycenaeans and Minoans, multiple editions
 Platon, Nicolas, Crete (translated from the Greek), Archaeologia Mundi series, Frederick Muller Limited, London, 1966
Vasilakis, Andonis, Minoan Crete: From Myth to History, 2000, Adam Editions, Athens, 
 Willetts, The Civilization of Ancient Crete, Barnes & Noble, 1976,

External links
 Minoan Civilization, Myrtos Museum site.
 The First Great Expansion of Aegean Commerce, Chapter 9 in H. J. Kantor, Plant Ornament in the Ancient Near East
 The Impact of Cycladic Settlers on Early Minoan Crete, article by Philip P. Betancourt in Mediterranean Archaeology and Archaeometry, Vol. 3 No. 1 2003.
 Minoans and Mycenaeans: Sociopolitical & Economic Evidence for LM III Crete at Knossos and Khania
 The Palaces of Minos at Knossos, article by Colin F. Macdonald in Athena Review, Vol.3, no.3: Minoan Crete
 A brief history of Knosós, British School at Athens
 Aegean Archaeology Research Resources UT Arlington
 Settlement Patterns ... in East Crete in the Final Neolithic, Peter Tomkins et al.
 The Rise of the Minoan Palaces, article by Ioannis Georganas in Antistoreton, Issue E985 of 1 July 1998.
 MINOAN TRADE: ASPECTS AND AMBIGUITIES, unrestricted thesis at the University of South Africa, by Deanne Kieser
 Courtyard Complexes and the Labyrinth of Minoan Culture, Michele A. Miller, Athena Review, Vol.3, no.3y

Chronology
Chronology
Chronology